Too Dumb for Suicide: Tim Heidecker's Trump Songs is a 2017 album by American musician and comedian Tim Heidecker. The album compiles parody songs critical of Donald Trump released by Heidecker over the course of Trump's presidency.

Track listing

References

2017 compilation albums
Tim Heidecker albums
Jagjaguwar albums
Comedy rock albums
Songs about Donald Trump